Fornes is a village in Andøy Municipality in Nordland county, Norway.  The village is located on the northeastern part of the large island of Hinnøya, at the confluence of the Risøysundet, Sortlandssundet, and Gavlfjorden.  The village is the home of Fornes Chapel.

References

Andøy
Villages in Nordland
Populated places of Arctic Norway